Artemy Lukyanovich Vedel (13 April 176726 July 1808) was a Ukrainian composer of liturgical music, who made an important contribution in the music history of Ukraine. Together with Maxim Berezovsky and Dmitry Bortniansky, Vedel is recognized as one of the 'Golden Three' composers of 18th century Ukrainian classical music, and one of Russia's greatest choral composers. Musicologists consider him to the archetypal composer of Ukrainian music from the baroque era.

References

Sources
 
  

Vedel